Septemberist or Septemberism may refer to:
 Septembrism or Setembrismo, a Portuguese political movement in the 1830s
 Dimitrovist Pioneer Organization "Septemberists", part of the Bulgarian pioneer movement
 Septemberists, insurgents involved in the September Uprising in Bulgaria in 1923
 "Septemberism", a 2010 song by Man Overboard from Real Talk

See also
 Decemberist
 Octoberist
 Septemvriytsi (disambiguation)